La Chupadera is the debut album by Dominican singer Antony Santos. It was released in 1991 by Platano Records. Although some music sites claim it was released on October 27, 1992, but in reality it was actually released the year before. The album was originally a self titled album until it was re-released with an alternative cover in 1998, thus re-naming it La Chupadera. The original cover of the album is the photo that's on top of the yellow background. The CD and Vinyl versions have the background while the cassette version only has the picture of Santos with his name on it.

Singles
The album includes a bachata cover of the song "Tu Carcel", a song by Mexican group Los Bukis from their 1987 album Me Volvi a Acordar de Ti. The lead singer of the band, Marco Antonio Solís, was one of Santos's inspirations. The cover is titled as "Te Vas Amor".

The album's main single, "Voy Pa'lla" became a huge success as it was the song that started Santos's legendary career as an artist. It is one of the most successful songs of the bachata genre. He became the first rural bachatero to reach a mainstream audience with this single. Even though it is one of his greatest hits, it may not be his song. In 1991, Dominican bachata artist Frank Reyes also released the same song for his debut album Tú Serás Mi Reina. An article by the Diario Oriental (Oriental Journal) mentions that it was possibly Reyes who had recorded the song first and then Santos made a cover of that same song. Yet, it is unclear who's version is the original as Reyes's version is not as known as Santos's version.

Track listing

Charts

References 

1991 debut albums
Antony Santos albums
Latin music albums
Spanish-language albums